The Khalkha dialect ( /  /) is a dialect of central Mongolic widely spoken in Mongolia. According to some classifications, the Khalkha dialect includes Southern Mongolian varieties such as Shiliin gol, Ulaanchab and Sönid. As it was the basis for the Cyrillic orthography of Mongolian, it is de facto the national language of Mongolia. The name of the dialect is related to the name of the Khalkha Mongols and the Khalkha river.

There are certain differences between normative (standardised form of Khalkha) and spoken Khalkha. For example, the normative language uses proximal demonstratives based on the word stem  (except for the nominative   and the accusative which takes the stem ) and thus exhibits the same developmental tendency as exhibited by Oirat. This seems to agree with the use in Chakhar Mongolian. The same holds for the distal demonstrative .

Khalkha may roughly be divided into Northern and Southern Khalkha, which would include Sönid etc. Both varieties share affricate depalatalization, namely,  >  and  >  except before *i, while Southern Khalkha patterns with Chakhar and Ordos Mongolian in that it exhibits a dissimilating deaspiration; e.g.  > . However, Mongolian scholars more often hold that the border between Khalkha and Chakhar is the border between the Mongolian state and the Chakhar area of South Mongolia.

Especially in the speech of younger speakers,  (or ) >  may take place, as in Written Mongolian qabtasu > Sünid  ~  'cover (of a book)'.

One of the classifications of Khalkha dialect in Mongolia divides it into 3 subdialects: Central, Western and Eastern. The orthography of the Mongolian Cyrillic alphabet is essentially based on the Central Khalkha dialect. Among the main differences is the pronunciation of initial letter х in feminine words which is in Central Khalkha pronounced as it is written, in Western Khalkha as h,  and in Eastern Khalkha as g; e.g.  hötöl (Central Khalkha),  kötöl (Western Khalkha),  götöl (Eastern Khalkha). Initial /tʰ/ is unaspirated in Eastern Khalkha; e.g.  talh  (Central Khalkha),  talq  (Western Khalkha),  dalh  (Eastern Khalkha).

Grouping of Khalkha dialects 
In Juha Janhunen's book Mongolian, he groups the Khalkha dialects into the following 19:

 Outer Mongolia:
 Central
 Khalkha Proper dialect
 northern Khalkha
 southern Khalkha
 Ulan Bator dialect of Khalkha
 Northern:
 the Khotgoit (Xotgaid) dialect
 the Darkhat (Darxed) dialect
 Southeastern:
 the Dariganga (Darygengg) dialect
 Russia:
 Tsongol (Tzonggel)
 Sartul (Sartool)
 officially, both are classified as "Buryat" dialects.
 Inner Mongolia:
 the Ulan Tsab dialects:
 the Chakhar (Tzaxer) dialect
 the Urat (Ourd) dialect
 the Darkhan (Darxen) dialect
 the Dörben Huuhet (Deurben Xuuxed) dialect
 the Muumingan (Moo Minggen) dialect
 the Keshigten (Xeshegten) dialect
 Shilingol (Shiilin Gol) dialects:
 Udzumuchin (Udzencem) dialect
 Khuuchit (Xooced) dialect
 Abaga (Abegh) dialect
 Abaganar (Abeghner) dialect
 Sunit (Seund) dialect

References

Bibliography
 Amaržargal, B. (1988): BNMAU dah’ mongol helnij nutgijn ajalguuny tol’ bichig: halh ajalguu. Ulaanbaatar: ŠUA.
 Birtalan, Ágnes (2003): Oirat. In: Janhunen (ed.) 2003: 210-228.
 Bläsing, Uwe (2003): Kalmuck. In: Janhunen (ed.) 2003: 229-247.
 Janhunen, Juha (ed.) (2003): The Mongolic languages. London: Routledge.
 Janhunen, Juha (2003a): Mongol dialects. In: Janhunen 2003: 177-191.
 Ölǰeyibürin (2001): Sünid aman ayalγun-u geyigülügči abiyalaburi-yin sistem. In: Mongγol Kele Utq-a ǰokiyal 2001/1: 16-23.
 Poppe, Nicholas (1951): Khalkha-mongolische Grammatik. Wiesbaden: Franz Steiner.
 Sečenbaγatur, Qasgerel, Tuyaγ-a, B. ǰirannige, U Ying ǰe (2005): Mongγul kelen-ü nutuγ-un ayalγun-u sinǰilel-ün uduridqal. Kökeqota: Öbür mongγul-un arad-un keblel-ün qoriy-a.
 Street, John (1957): The language of the Secret history of the Mongols. American Oriental series 42.
 Svantesson, Jan-Olof, Anna Tsendina, Anastasia Karlsson, Vivan Franzén (2005): The Phonology of Mongolian. New York: Oxford University Press.

Agglutinative languages
Central Mongolic languages